Crates or Craterus (Κρατερός) was a mining (μεταλλευτής metalleutes) and hydraulic engineer, who accompanied Alexander the Great. He was entrusted with draining Lake Copais in Boeotia  and contributed to the construction of Alexandria. It appears that Crates may have been an Olynthian who settled in the Euboean mother-city, Chalcis, after the destruction of Olynthus in 348 BC.

References
Who's Who in the Age of Alexander the Great by Waldemar Heckel 

4th-century BC Greek people
Engineers of Alexander the Great
Ancient Euboeans
Ancient Olynthians
Ancient Greek engineers